Milon Hossain is a Bangladeshi professional field hockey player and is an international player in Bangladesh. He is a player of Bangladesh national field hockey team.

References

Bangladeshi male field hockey players
Field hockey players at the 2014 Asian Games
Field hockey players at the 2018 Asian Games
Year of birth missing (living people)
Living people